Mustafa Naili Pasha ( or Giritli Mustafa Naili Paşa, literally "Mustafa Naili Pasha of Crete"; 1798–1871) was an Ottoman statesman, who held the office of Grand Vizier twice during the reign of Abdülmecid I, the first time between 14 May 1853 and 29 May 1854, and the second time between 6 August 1857 and 22 October 1857. 

His office of Grand Vizier has been marked by the tensions between the Ottoman Empire and the Russian Empire. His first period of office coincides with the immediate eve of the start of the Crimean War and his second, with the aftermath of that war.

Biography 

He was raised and started his career in Egypt under the protection of the Albanian ruler Kavalalı Mehmed Ali Pasha and was of Albanian descent like the founder of modern Egypt. He suppressed a rebellion of Cretan Greeks during the troubles of the 1820s in various Aegean Islands in league with the Greek War of Independence and subsequently (in 1832) was appointed governor to Crete. On 18 May 1828 he regained Frangokastello (in Crete), to Ottoman control, from Hatzimichalis Dalianis. The Ottoman sultan, Mahmud II, who had been caught unprepared and without an army of his own (having suppressed the Janissaries), had been forced to seek the aid of his rebellious vassal and rival in Egypt. As of 1832, when Mustafa Naili Pasha got appointed governor of Crete which was under the domains of Mehmet Ali Pasha, he already had been present on the rebellious island for four years, which is why Ottoman records immediately refer to him as "Giritli" (the Cretan).

His rule attempted to create a synthesis between the Muslim landowners and the emergent Christian commercial classes. Mustafa Naili Pasha's rule has been generally cautious, pro-British, and he has tried harder to win the support of the Cretan Greeks (having married the daughter of a priest and allowed her to remain Christian) than the Cretan Turks. In 1834, however, a Cretan committee was already set up in Athens to work for the union of the island with Greece.

In 1840, Egypt was forced by Palmerston to return Crete to direct Ottoman rule. For a time, Mustafa Naili Pasha angled unsuccessfully to become a semi-independent prince but the Cretan Greeks rose up against him, once more driving the Muslims temporarily into siege in the towns. An Anglo-Ottoman naval operation restored control in the island and Mustafa Naili Pasha was confirmed as its governor, though under command from İstanbul. He remained in Crete until 1851 when he was summoned to the capital, where at a relatively advanced age he pursued a successful career.

Sources

See also
 David Barchard, The Princely Pasha of Crete; Cornucopia, Issue 30, 2003/2004.
List of Ottoman Grand Viziers

1798 births
1871 deaths
Pashas
Ottoman governors of Crete
19th-century Grand Viziers of the Ottoman Empire
Albanian Grand Viziers of the Ottoman Empire
Albanians from the Ottoman Empire
People from Maliq
Grand Viziers of Egypt